Major-general Francis Fuller (died 10 June 1748) was an officer of the British Army.

He was the elder son of Edward Fuller, a descendant of the Fullers of Uckfield in Sussex. On 19 July 1711 he was appointed lieutenant (ranking as a captain in the Army) in the 1st Regiment of Foot Guards. He was promoted to captain and lieutenant-colonel on 11 June 1715, second major of the regiment on 5 June 1733, first major on 5 July 1735, and lieutenant-colonel of the regiment on 15 December 1738.

On 28 August 1739 Fuller was appointed colonel of the former George Reade's Regiment of Foot. He was promoted to brigadier-general on 18 February 1742 and major-general on 12 July 1743, and was involved in the Battle at Port-la-Joye.  He died while serving with his regiment at Cape Breton.

References
 Major H. Everard, History of Thos. Farrington's Regiment, subsequently designated the 29th (Worcestershire) Foot, 1694 to 1891. Worcester, 1891. page 564

1748 deaths
British Army major generals
Grenadier Guards officers
British Army personnel of the Seven Years' War
29th Regiment of Foot officers
Year of birth unknown